Legend of the Demon Cat is a 2017 Xianxia fantasy mystery film directed by Chen Kaige, based on the novel Śramaṇa Kūkai (Japanese: 沙門空海　唐の国にて鬼と宴す) written by Japanese writer Yoneyama Mineo, known under the pen-name Baku Yumemakura. It was released in China in December 2017.

Plot

The story is a supernatural reimagining of the story of death of Yang Guifei.  The movie opens with Chunqin, the wife of an army commander, making a reluctant bargain with a talking black cat. In exchange for the eyes of fish which are eaten by the cat, Chunqin finds a pot of coin which she shares with her husband.
The Japanese Buddhist monk Kukai is called to the imperial palace to assist Emperor Xuanzong who is cursed with a supernatural ailment.  The Emperor passes away while strange cat wailings can be heard.  Kukai makes the acquaintance of Bai Letian the poet whose major work is "Chang hen ge" - Song of Everlasting Sorrow (長恨歌)- the story about the life of the Emperor's favorite concubine Yang Guifei.
The commander's wife has lapsed into a coma.  When Kukai and Bai Letian investigate they see an visage of Chunqin on the roof reciting a poem.  Kukai believe this visage is that of a demon cat.

They research the poem being recited by Chunqin and learn that it was one that was composed at Yang Guifei's wedding banquet.  They decide to visit Yang Guifei's abandoned residence.  Inside they see Chunqin's visage.  The visage explains that she was once Yang Guifei's beloved cat.  She explained that she was buried alive but was allowed to escape.  It became a demon cat in order to exact revenge.  The cat later possess the commander and while possessed he kills Chunqin.  The commander goes insane.

Bai Letian believes his work Everlasting Sorrow would be fraudulent if he is not able to learn the real story behind Yang Guifei's death.  
Bai and Kukai would visit Concubine Yang's lady in waiting, Qin Yi, but she was not present when the concubine died.  The demon cat kills Qin Yi after their visit.  They learned of the existence of the Japanese envoy Abe no Nakamaro and obtain his diary from his widow who is still in China.  They learned that during the crisis where the imperial soldiers surrounded the royal residence, they had hatched a plan to save Yang Guifei's life.  This would involve using an acupuncture technique that would make Yang seem dead for a period of time.  Yang would later revive.  The soldiers would be satisfied she was dead.  The plan works and the soldiers leave the residence.
Yang was then placed in a coffin and buried inside in a tomb.  Her black cat was left in the tomb.

Kukai and Bai Letian visit Yang Guifei's tomb.  They realize Yang Guifei was buried alive in the coffin from the marks inside.  They realize that the plot was actually meant to trick Yang Guifei and the Emperor had no plans to rescue her from the tomb. This was because nobody could bear the guilt of killing her.
Yang's two loyal charges Bai Ling and Bai Long attend at her grave.  Bai Ling confesses that he was aware of the plan to trick Yang Guifei and put poison into her wine so she would not suffer.  Bai Long is shocked at this.  He refuses to abandon the grave.  Bai long sacrifices himself and imbues his spirit into the black cat.  When his spirit melded with that of the cat he learned that the poison did not work and Yang Guifei was buried alive.  The (now) demon cat returned to the palace and attacks the Emperor putting a curse on him.
Kukai and Bai Letain are joined by Bai Ling at the tomb.  The cat attacks Bai Ling.  Bai Ling told the cat that he retrieved Bai Long's body and had put it beside Yang Guifei's.  Bai Long tells the cat that he is prepared to die.  The cat goes to attack but returns to try to get onto the coffin.  The Demon cat is unable to mount the coffin.  He sees the image of a white crane (Bai Long is white crane) fly off and the cat dies.
Kukai and Bai Letain are seen walking in the city.  Bai Letain said he does not intend to change his poem even though it is not correct.  Kukai returns to his monastery in Japan.  He gives a sutra to a monk and ask him whether he had found the secret to life without sorrow.

Cast

Huang Xuan as Bai Letian
Shōta Sometani as Kūkai
Kitty Zhang as Chunqin
Qin Hao as Chen Yunqiao 
Hiroshi Abe as Abe no Nakamaro
Keiko Matsuzaka as Bai Ling
Liu Haoran as Bai Long 
Oho Ou as The young Dan Long
Zhang Tianai as Yulian
Zhang Luyi as Emperor Xuanzong of Tang
Sandrine Pinna as Lady Yang
Tian Yu as Gao Lishi
Liu Peiqi as Huang He
Xin Baiqing as Li Bai
Cheng Taisheng as The Old Dan Long
Mason Lee as The Chamberlain
Qin Yi as Old Lady-in-waiting
Shōhei Hino as Kūkai's Teacher

Production 
A set costing US$200 million and five years to create was constructed for the film. It was reported that the set will be turned into a theme park.

Awards and nominations

See also
Chang hen ge (poem)

References

External links

2017 fantasy films
2017 films
Chinese mystery films
Chinese fantasy films
Chinese multilingual films
Demons in film
Films about cats
Films based on Japanese novels
Films about revenge
Films directed by Chen Kaige
Films scored by Klaus Badelt
Films set in 8th-century Tang dynasty
Films set in Japan
Films set in Xi'an
Hong Kong films about revenge
Hong Kong fantasy films
Hong Kong mystery films
Hong Kong multilingual films
Japanese multilingual films
Japanese films about revenge
Japanese fantasy films
Japanese mystery films
Kūkai
Films with live action and animation
2010s Japanese films
2010s Hong Kong films